John David Freeman (born 4 November 2001) is an English semi-professional footballer who plays as a midfielder for Northern Premier League Division One Midlands club Cambridge City.

Club career

Milton Keynes Dons
Born in Stevenage, Freeman joined the academy of Milton Keynes Dons at the age of nine and progressed through several age groups at the club. During his later academy years, he suffered two long-term injuries, firstly a ruptured knee ligament followed by a broken leg.

In September 2020, Freeman was given the squad number 30 ahead of the 2020–21 season having signed his first professional deal in the summer. He made his professional first team debut for the club the following day in an EFL Cup first round home tie against Coventry City.

On 15 April 2021, Freeman signed a contract extension keeping him at the club beyond the 2020–21 campaign, before joining National League side Woking on loan for the remainder of the season. The following 2021–22 campaign saw limited first team opportunities for Freeman and at the halfway point he spent several weeks out on loan to National League South club Chelmsford City. Freeman was later one of six players released by MK Dons at the end of the season.

Cambridge City
In August 2022, Freeman joined Northern Premier League Division One Midlands club Cambridge City.

Career statistics

References

2001 births
Living people
English footballers
People from Stevenage
Footballers from Hertfordshire
Association football midfielders
Milton Keynes Dons F.C. players
Kempston Rovers F.C. players
Wantage Town F.C. players
St Neots Town F.C. players
Woking F.C. players
Chelmsford City F.C. players
Cambridge City F.C. players